Australia women's national floorball team is the national team of Australia. At the 1999 Floorball Women's World Championship in Borlänge, Sweden, the team finished second in the B-Division. At the 2001 Floorball Women's World Championship in Riga, Latvia, the team finished sixth in the B-Division. At the 2003 Floorball Women's World Championship in Germany, the team finished eighth in the B-Division. At the 2005 Floorball Women's World Championship in Singapore, the team finished fifth in the B-Division. At the 2007 Floorball Women's World Championship in Frederikshavn, Denmark, the team finished fifth in the B-Division. At the 2009 Floorball Women's World Championship in Västerås, Sweden, the team won B-Division, and finished eleventh. At the 2011 Floorball Women's World Championship in St Gallen, Switzerland, the team finished fifteenth. At the 2013 Floorball Women's World Championship in Brno and Ostrava, Czech Republic, the team finished twelfth.

References 

Women's national floorball teams
Floorball